Eisentraut's striped mouse or Eisentraut's hybomys (Hybomys badius) is a species of rodent in the family Muridae.
It is found only in Cameroon.
Its natural habitat is subtropical or tropical moist montane forests.
It is threatened by habitat loss.

References

Musser, G. G. and M. D. Carleton. 2005. Superfamily Muroidea. pp. 894–1531 in Mammal Species of the World a Taxonomic and Geographic Reference. D. E. Wilson and D. M. Reeder eds. Johns Hopkins University Press, Baltimore.
 Van der Straeten, E. 2004.  Hybomys eisentrauti.   2006 IUCN Red List of Threatened Species.   Downloaded on 19 July 2007.

Hybomys
Rodents of Africa
Mammals described in 1936
Taxonomy articles created by Polbot
Taxa named by Wilfred Hudson Osgood
Fauna of the Cameroonian Highlands forests